Wena Piande is a former Papua New Guinea international lawn bowler.

Piande won a silver medal in the Women's fours at the 1994 Commonwealth Games in Victoria with Elizabeth Bure, Linda Ahmat and Cunera Monalua.

References

Living people
Bowls players at the 1994 Commonwealth Games
Commonwealth Games silver medallists for Papua New Guinea
Commonwealth Games medallists in lawn bowls
Papua New Guinean female bowls players
Year of birth missing (living people)
Medallists at the 1994 Commonwealth Games